Church End, commonly known locally as "Church Road", is a small locality in the London Borough of Brent and a sub-district of Willesden. The population is predominantly Afro-Caribbean.

The street Church Road is the main thoroughfare of the neighbourhood, which also includes a short crescent at the northern end, just off Willesden Magistrates Court. To the west, the Dudding Hill Line and Taylors Lane Power Station separates it from Brentfield Road in Stonebridge.

The nearest train station at its northern end is Neasden and at its southern end is Harlesden. Bus routes 260 and 266 serve Church Road, with 297 at the northern end and 18/N18 at the southern end.

Church End Estate
Church End is a deprived community with a large Caribbean and newer Somali population. Hassan Farah was credited with getting four local British Somali youngsters from the Queen's Road Community School to Oxbridge. The 2020 COVID-19 pandemic has had a serious effect on this community. At least 36 residents have died, making this cluster the second worst in England and Wales. Many of the victims have been men, like Farah in their 40s and 50s- whole families have been wiped out. Brent has the highest age-standardised coronavirus death rate in the country, excess deaths being three times the national average.

History

Church End arose as the area around St. Mary's Church near Willesden. It was known as "the Churchend" in the late 16th century. During the 18th century, a village and inns developed around the church. The arrival of the railways in the 19th century lead to further development, though the area remained agricultural to begin with. An 1876 book noted "There are a few houses about the ch., at what is called Church End" and recorded there being two inns, the White Horse and the White Hart. Industry and "poor housing" grew the area to be contiguous with Harlesden, though Roundwood Park was still green space. By the 20th century it was one of the poorest parts of London and from the 1960s was known for high rates of unemployment. Road widening and building in the 1960s changed the character of the area.

The council transferred Church End Estate and Roundwood Estate to Fortunegate in 1998 in a regeneration scheme. A regeneration plan for the Church End Neighbourhood Centre was approved by the council cabinet in 2016.

Crime
Church End Estate, along with Roundwood Estate and some of Harlesden, is associated with the Church Road Soldiers street gang. Gang violence led to the fatal shootings in Church End in 2016 of two men in their twenties who were uninvolved in gangs, Oliver Tetlow and James Owusu-Ajyekum.

Notable residents
Nines
Ice City Boyz

See also
Roundwood Park

References

External links
 Church End growth area, Brent Council
 Church End, Brent, Catalyst Housing

Areas of London
Districts of the London Borough of Brent